A constant slope barrier is a traffic barrier made of reinforced concrete and designed with a single slope that is used to separate lanes of vehicular traffic.  Its advantages compared to more complex shapes arise because its performance is not as affected by changes in the height of the roadbed during repaving.

California has developed a constant slope barrier with an angle of 9.1 degrees with respect to the vertical. The Texas Constant-Slope barrier has performed similarly in crash tests to the Jersey barrier. The California design compared similarly to the F-Shape barrier in crash tests.

References 
 Basics of Concrete Barriers, by Charles F. McDevitt
 Basics of Concrete Barriers - Free Online Library, by Charles F. McDevitt

Road safety
Protective barriers
Road infrastructure